Fistgloves are latex gloves that do not have individual sheaths for individual fingers, but rather a larger volume that is meant to take the hand in the shape of a fist. (Another variation of these is known as antipaddles, a rectangle with a flat side to place the palm against and a rounded side to create the "fist" effect.) Fistgloves are meant to enhance a feeling for water while swimming, especially while using the Total Immersion style of swimming. It works by sensory deprivation for the open palm while swimming (especially for front crawl) so that when the fistgloves are removed, a new rush of sensory perception is picked up by the hand as water rushes past it during the ideal stroke.

Swimming equipment